A Martian packet is an IP packet seen on the public Internet that contains a source or destination address that is reserved for special-use by Internet Assigned Numbers Authority (IANA) as defined in , Appendix B Glossary (Martian Address Filtering). On the public Internet, such a packet either has a spoofed source address, and it cannot actually originate as claimed, or the packet cannot be delivered.

Martian packets commonly arise from IP address spoofing in denial-of-service attacks, but can also arise from network equipment malfunction or misconfiguration of a host.

In Linux terminology, a martian packet is an IP packet received by the kernel on a specific interface, while routing tables indicate that the source IP is expected on another interface.

The name is derived from packet from Mars, meaning that packet seems to be not of this Earth.

IPv4 and IPv6
In both IPv4 and IPv6, a Martian packet has a source address, a destination address, or both within one of the special-use ranges.

Transition mechanisms

6to4
6to4 is an IPv6 transition technology where the IPv6 address encodes the originating IPv4 address such that every IPv4  has a corresponding, unique IPv6  prefix.  Because 6to4 relays use the encoded value for determining the end site of the 6to4 tunnel, 6to4 addresses corresponding to IPv4 martians are not routable and should never appear on the public Internet.

Teredo tunneling
Teredo is another IPv6 transition technology that encodes the originating IPv4 address in the IPv6 address. However, the encoding format encodes the Teredo server address and tunnel information before the IPv4 client address. It is, however, possible to spoof Teredo packets with the Teredo server IPv4 address set to a martian.

See also

 Bogon filtering
 Christmas tree packet
 Broadcast storm

References 

Packets (information technology)
Denial-of-service attacks
IP addresses